The Encyclopedia of World History is a classic single-volume work detailing world history.  The first through fifth editions were edited by William L. Langer.

The Sixth Edition contained over 20,000 entries and was overseen by  Peter N. Stearns. It was made available online until removed in 2009.

Preceding works

Publication history

First five editions
An Encyclopedia of World History: Advanced, Medieval, and Modern, Chronologically Arranged.

Compiled and Edited by William L. Langer, Coolidge Professor of History, (Emeritus by 1968), Harvard University.

 
  free download

Sixth Edition (2001)

 Houghton Mifflin Company (September 2001) 
 James Clarke & Co Ltd. (January 2002) 
 Easton Press (2006)

1940 non-fiction books
1948 non-fiction books
1952 non-fiction books
1968 non-fiction books
1972 non-fiction books
2001 non-fiction books
World History
Houghton Mifflin books
20th-century encyclopedias